The Virginia Slims of Boston is a defunct WTA Tour affiliated women's tennis tournament played from 1971 to 1984. It was held in Boston in the United States and played on indoor hard courts from 1971 to 1980 and on indoor carpet courts from 1981 to 1984.

Results

Singles

Doubles

References
 WTA Results Archive

External links

 
Hard court tennis tournaments
Carpet court tennis tournaments
Indoor tennis tournaments
Defunct tennis tournaments in the United States
Virginia Slims tennis tournaments
Recurring sporting events established in 1971
Recurring events disestablished in 1984
1971 establishments in Massachusetts
1984 disestablishments in Massachusetts